"Problem" is a song by American singer Ariana Grande, featuring Australian rapper Iggy Azalea. It was written by both alongside Savan Kotecha, Ilya and Max Martin, being produced by the latter two with Shellback, with Peter Carlsson serving as a vocal producer. The song was released by Republic Records on April 28, 2014, as the lead single from Grande's second studio album My Everything (2014). "Problem" is an uptempo dance-pop and R&B with influences of funk music, which comprises a melody based on drums, saxophone loops, and trumpets. The chorus features uncredited background vocals from American hip hop artist Big Sean. Lyrically, Grande has stated that the song is about "the feeling of being absolutely terrified to re-approach a relationship that's gone sour – but you want to more than anything."

The song debuted at number three on the Billboard Hot 100 selling 438,000 copies in its first week on sale, earning Grande her biggest digital song sales week ever. The song later peaked at number two, surpassing "The Way" as her highest-charting single in the United States at the time. It also became Azalea's second-highest-charting single in the US, after her own single "Fancy". "Problem" remained in the top ten of the Hot 100 for the first sixteen weeks of its chart run, making its number three debut on May 7, 2014, and dropping out of the top ten on August 27, 2014. It topped the US Mainstream Top 40 and Rhythmic charts. Internationally, the single debuted at the top of the charts in Ireland, New Zealand, and the United Kingdom, while peaking within the top ten of the charts in most other territories, including Australia, Canada, Mexico, Sweden, Denmark, and Greece. "Problem" became the first song to top the UK Singles chart based on both sales and streaming.

To promote the song, Grande performed it first at the 2014 Radio Disney Music Awards, followed by the 2014 iHeartRadio Music Awards, on The Ellen DeGeneres Show and at the 2014 Billboard Music Awards. The song's accompanying music video was directed by Nev Todorovic and premiered on Vevo on May 30, 2014. It won "Best Pop Video" at the 2014 MTV Video Music Awards and has been viewed more than 1.3 billion times as of September 2021. The song itself won "Best Song" at the 2014 MTV Europe Music Awards.

As of 2018, the single has sold 3.7 million copies in the US and has been certified sextuple platinum by the Recording Industry Association of America (RIAA) in March 2016. It ultimately reached combined sales and track-equivalent streams of 9 million units worldwide, becoming one of the best-selling singles of all time.

Background
Following the release of Grande's debut studio album Yours Truly in September 2013, which was met with critical acclaim, Grande announced in October 2013 that she had already begun writing and working on her second studio album with previous producers from her debut album, including Harmony Samuels, Babyface, The Rascals and Tommy Brown. Grande was initially aiming at releasing the album around February 2014. In January 2014, recording sessions for the album officially began and Grande confirmed she was working with new producers Ryan Tedder, Savan Kotecha, Benny Blanco and Max Martin. It was announced on March 3, 2014, that Grande would be featured on the fifth single from Chris Brown's upcoming sixth studio album X titled "Don't Be Gone Too Long". The single was originally set for release on March 25, 2014, but it was postponed due to Brown being sent to jail awaiting trial on assault charges. Grande announced the song's delay on March 17, 2014, via Twitter, stating "My loves... so obviously some things have changed recently... So we have to delay the dbgtl countdown, some things are out of our control". That same night she held a live stream to make up for the single's delay, where she previewed four new songs from her second album. Two days later, Grande revealed that due to the song's delay, she would be releasing the first single from her upcoming sophomore studio album earlier instead.

Grande and Azalea had originally planned for Azalea to appear on Grande's debut album in September 2013, however, it never panned out. Once Grande began working on "Problem" she thought Azalea would be the perfect fit for the track to create "the perfect girl-power duo" for the song. Azalea agreed to appear on the song and went in with producer Max Martin to write her own verse before recording it for the song. The line "one less problem without you" was inspired by an article from Cosmopolitan. Big Sean, who is featured in Grande's previous single "Right There", also appears on the song uncredited as a background vocalist in which he provides the whisper-like vocals of the chorus although he is not a featured artist. Initially while recording songs for the album, after Grande had recorded "Problem" she "fell out of love" with the song and didn't want it to appear on her second album. However, following an album listening session with her management and record label, when "Problem" came on Grande said "What the hell is wrong with me? Holy shit!", realizing her love for the song and decided to keep it for the album. Lyrically, the song is about "the feeling of being absolutely terrified to re-approach a relationship that's gone sour – but you want to more than anything."

Release and remixes
After recording multiple songs for the album, Grande stated that she had chosen the first single from her album. On April 15, 2014, it was officially announced that "Problem" would be the title of the lead single from the album. Grande later hinted that Australian rapper Iggy Azalea would accompany her on the track. She created online buzz in the weeks leading up to her single's release through social media, first released promotional images from the single's photo shoot all throughout March 2014. On April 10, 2014, Grande asked her fans to choose between two new possible images to be used for the single's artwork release. After the votes were tallied, she revealed the winning cover artwork through her Instagram account the next day with the hashtag #10daystilproblem, and revealed that Iggy Azalea would be assisting her on the track. The winning image, the more seductive image of the pair, shows Grande leaning back in a foldout chair, dressed in a black camisole, white thigh-highs, and metal-tipped stilettos. Grande is also shown flipping through her hair while looking directly into the camera. The song was released at midnight to iTunes on April 28, 2014. The single was made available for pre-order on April 21, 2014. The single made its world radio premiere on On Air with Ryan Seacrest on April 28, 2014. A remix of the song was released on May 16, 2014, entitled the "Young California Remix" and features an additional rap verse from American rapper Problem. A Spanglish version of the song was also released featuring Colombian rapper J Balvin for the Hispanophone market, making it the second collaboration between the two artists. On August 11, a remix version by DJ Boss in Drama was released in Brazil featuring Brazilian pop singer Gretchen.

Composition
Musically, "Problem" is an uptempo dance-pop and R&B song that incorporates elements of jazz, contemporary '90s R&B, hip hop and funk which comprises the instruments like drums, saxophones and trumpets. It runs for a duration of three minutes and 14 seconds. The song was written by Grande, Azalea, Savan Kotecha, Ilya Salmanzadeh and Max Martin, and produced by the latter two along with Shellback. According to the sheet music published by Alfred Publishing Co., Inc. on Musicnotes.com, "Problem" is composed in the key of G minor and set in common time at a moderate tempo of 103 beats per minute. The melody spans the tonal range of G3 to G5 belt and D6 in falsetto, while the music follows the chord progression of Emaj7–F–B– Emaj7–F–G♯m.

The track opens with a dose of "jazzy saxophones" before the more modern "horn-heavy" "drum-filled beat drops". The song's melody constantly builds toward something that "should be explosive", before Azalea brings it back down with her verse "Smart money bettin' I'll be better off without you/ In no time I'll be forgettin' all about you/ You sayin' that you know but I really, really doubt you/understand my life is easy when I ain't around you." Azalea also makes a reference to the Jay-Z song "99 Problems" at the end of her verse "There's a million yous baby boo, so don't be dumb/ I got 99 problems but you won't be one." Additionally, Grande's notes serve as a metaphor for what the song is about. She can't get rid of her crush, who she knows isn't good for her and can't help but fall in love quickly. As her "heart gets lighter and lighter", Grande sings "Head in the clouds/ got no weight on my shoulders/ I should be wiser and realize that I've got/ One less problem without you." A writer from Rap-Up describes the track as an "infectious horn-heavy jam" which features a "carefree" Ariana "declaring her independence" which also includes "an empowering verse from Iggy Azalea and a whispering Big Sean on the hook." Several critics noted a similarity between the jazzy saxophone breakdown in "Problem" and Jason Derulo's 2013 single "Talk Dirty."

Critical reception

Mike Wass of Idolator described the song as "an odd blend of '90s pop and current urban trends but there's no denying that it's catchy." Entertainment Weekly called the song a "dramatic reinvention," and also notes, "The idea that Grande was collaborating with bad girl du jour Iggy Azalea prompted all kinds of speculation, and the result is more or less what everybody expected: Grande's enviable pipes are still the centerpiece, but she also invites a sax-drunk loop, sexy whisper tracks, and Azalea's Jay Z-referencing high-speed verse to the party as well." Music Times commented that "the saxophone-filled track continues the pattern set by Grande's 2013 debut album Yours Truly by being heavily influenced by the '90s R&B scene. This time, 'Problem' pulls from the funky, funky streets with a jazz-influenced riff. An overwhelming (but welcome) dose of saxophone leads the song before the more modern drum-filled beat drops." In addition, 4Music said "Ariana's sweet-sounding vocals contrast brilliantly with Problem's sexy sax and Iggy's gritty rap."

Pitchfork named it "Best New Track", saying that it "bears all the hallmarks of a future smash, as if the future wasn't actually right now." Writing for MTV, Emilee Lindner praised the song's throwback sound, which Grande admits to striving for, while still keeping it fresh and modern, stating: "The song is so excitingly new but also decidedly so retro... The cranky sax, the whispered chorus, the airy harmonies and Iggy's snarky feature all tied in with a juicy modern beat." Lindner continued by calling it "the freshest pop song of the moment", commending the song's production for its "more than a few unexpected throwbacks", comparing the saxophone loops to Jennifer Lopez's 2004 single "Get Right" saying "It's the same notes over and over, but its attitude doesn't let you zone out", while the whispers in the chorus echoes to the Ying Yang Twins' 2005 single "Wait." In July 2014, Billboard listed the song as one of the "10 Best Songs of 2014 (so far)" saying that "the snappy R&B of Ariana Grande's breakout hit 'The Way' feels minimalist compared to the multi-faceted bubblegum of 'Problem'". Meanwhile, Pitchfork named it the 33rd best song of 2014. At the time of the single's release, Problem became Grande's highest-charting song on the Billboard Hot 100, peaking at the number 2 spot.

Accolades

Commercial performance

North America
Upon its release, "Problem" reached the top position on the iTunes singles chart in over 40 countries and the top ten in over 60 countries, including the United States, where it reached the summit in 37 minutes, hence breaking the previous record held by Taylor Swift, whose single, "We Are Never Ever Getting Back Together" (2012), reached the top spot on the iTunes singles chart with a record of 37 minutes, making "Problem" the fastest selling single in digital history. On April 29, 2014, Billboard reported that "Problem" would most likely sell more than 300,000 copies by the end of its first week of availability in the United States, as well as that the song could easily debut within the top 10 of the Billboard Hot 100 chart regardless of any added airplay or streaming points. In addition to its sales, which accounted for the majority of its debut chart points on the Hot 100, "Problem" began receiving early radio support. The song drew 293 first-day plays on 87 stations on the day of its release, according to Nielsen BDS. Pop Songs reporter KIIS Los Angeles led all stations with 17 first-day plays. Among all stations, "Problem" garnered 3.8 million in opening-day radio audience.

"Problem" officially debuted at number three on the Billboard Hot 100 chart on the week ending on May 7, 2014, becoming Grande's second single to debut in the top ten, and her second top ten overall at the time, the other being "The Way". It became the highest debuting song of 2014 at the time, and the highest debuting song since Eminem's "The Monster," featuring Rihanna. "Problem" boasted just 1.3% less points than John Legend's "All of Me", which claimed the Hot 100 top spot. In its second week, "Problem" fell one spot to number four despite gains in airplay and streaming, while Iggy Azalea's "Fancy" replaced it as number three. "Problem" returned to its number three peak the following week before moving to a new peak at number two in its fourth week on the chart; Azalea's "Fancy" moved to the top of both the Digital and Hot 100 charts, boasting 28% more overall chart points than "Problem". "Problem" remained in the runner-up spot the following week, holding that position for five consecutive weeks. The song stayed in the Hot 100's top 10 for the first 16 weeks of its chart run, making its number three debut on May 7, 2014, and dropping out of the top 10 on August 27, 2014.

On Billboard Pop Songs, the song debuted at number 28 and reached number 21 in its second week on the chart. It debuted at number 24 on Billboard Rhythmic Songs chart, it moved up eight places to number 16 in its second week on the chart and peaked at number one. It eventually reached number one on both the Billboard Pop Songs and Rhythmic Songs charts, becoming Grande's first number one single on both charts. "Problem" just missed the entry into the Billboard Radio Songs chart in its first week of availability. It officially entered in at number 30 on the chart, up 70% in audience impressions from 24 million to 41 million. It rocketed 14 spots to number 16 in its second week, granting it the Hot 100's top Airplay Gainer award. It reached the top 10 of the Radio Songs chart at number 10 in its third week on the chart, up 30% in audience impressions from 56 million to 73 million. The song reached a peak of Number 2 in its 7th week and remained there for 3 weeks. In addition to this, the track also debuted on the Streaming Songs chart at number nine in its first week and moved five spots to number four in its second week, with a weekly peak of 4.4 million and 6.5 million, respectively. It has since peaked at number two in its third week on the chart.

"Problem" debuted atop the Billboard Hot Digital Songs chart at number one, selling 438,000 copies in its opening week, thus earning Grande the highest first-week sales numbers of 2014 at the time and also her biggest digital song sales week ever, breaking her previous record held by "The Way", which sold 219,000 digital copies for the week ending April 5, 2013. It is Grande's first number one single on that chart. It is the overall 9th biggest debut for a digital song and is the 5th largest by a female artist, behind Taylor Swift's "We Are Never Ever Getting Back Together" (2012), Katy Perry's "Roar" (2013), Swift's "Shake It Off" (2014) and Lady Gaga's "Born This Way" (2011). Further, at 20 years old, Grande became the youngest woman to debut with more than 400,000 downloads. "Problem" also became the highest debut for a collaboration of only female soloists since "Give Me All Your Luvin'" by Madonna, Nicki Minaj and M.I.A. debuted at number 13 on the chart following Madonna's Super Bowl XLVI Halftime Show performance in February 2012. "Problem" spent a second week at number one on the Digital Songs chart with an additional 235,000 units sold, despite a 46% drop. The song topped the chart again in its third week selling 248,000 units, before slipping one spot to number two in its fourth week on the chart, despite a 15% growth of 284,000 units. The song reached its first million sales mark in the United States on May 28, 2014. On May 29, 2014, it was certified platinum by the Recording Industry Association of America, becoming Grande's second song to be certified platinum. As of April 2018, "Problem" has sold 3.7 million copies in the United States.

In Canada, "Problem" debuted at number three on the Canadian Hot 100 on May 17, 2014, becoming her first top 10 single in that country. In its second week on the chart the song dropped 12 places to number 15. In its 3rd week the song rose back to the top 10 at number six. In its fourth week the song rose even higher to number 4.  "Problem" was the first song to top the weekly Billboard Twitter Top Tracks chart on June 12, 2014.

Europe and Oceania
In the United Kingdom, "Problem" debuted at number one on the UK Singles Chart on July 6, 2014 ― for the week ending date July 12, 2014 ― becoming Grande's fourth charting single and first chart-topper in Britain and Azalea's seventh and first respectively. According to the Official Charts Company, "Problem" made British chart history upon its debut as the first song to top the charts in Britain based on both sales and streaming, with a combined 'chart sales' figure of 113,000. In the Belgian Ultratop 50, "Problem" peaked at number 26 in Flanders and number 40 in Wallonia. It also debuted at number 22 in Switzerland, becoming Grande's first charting single in that country. It also appeared in Netherlands at number 10, in Spain at number 11, in Austria at number 31, in Germany at number 25 and in Brazil at number 87.

In New Zealand, "Problem" made its first chart appearance on the New Zealand Singles Chart on the issue dated May 5, 2014. It debuted at the number-one spot on the chart, becoming the highest debut of the week, making it Grande's first single to top the charts in New Zealand, first top debut and her second top forty single. In its second week on the chart, the song dropped two spots to number three being replaced by the songs featured artist Iggy Azalea, whose single "Fancy" featuring Charli XCX took over the top spot.
In Azalea's native Australia, "Problem" gave Grande her first top 10 hit after it debuted at number four on the Australian Singles Chart, and eventually ascended to number two in its second week on the chart. It stayed in the top two for two consecutive weeks, Grande's previous best effort on the chart was "The Way" which peaked at number 37 in April 2013 and also became her second top 40 effort there. According to the International Federation of the Phonographic Industry (IFPI), "Problem" has achieved global sales of 9 millions of units (combined sales plus streaming data) as of 2015, ranking as the eighth best-selling single of 2014 and making it one of the best-selling singles worldwide.

Music video

Lyric video
Grande and Iggy Azalea filmed the lyric video for "Problem" on April 10, 2014, with Jones Crow as the director. Grande assisted Crow in editing the video and completed it on April 13, 2014 and it premiered on Vevo on May 1, 2014. The video features Grande and Azalea performing in a noir black-and-white clip behind pinwheel go-go filters.

Official music video

The official music video was filmed on April 29, 2014, just one day after the single's release, and was directed by The Young Astronauts who had previously worked with Grande on videos for her singles "Right There" and "Almost Is Never Enough". Kaz James makes an appearance in the video. The video was inspired in Sweet Charity (1969), set with a retro style from 1960s art movement containing a black, white, and old-fashioned aesthetic. The video opens on a sparkling figure where Grande appears in a sequined minidress and white go go boots with her dancers backed by a spiral backdrop. Iggy Azalea is shown in front of a colorful background, and, as Jason Lipzshuts from Billboord noted, her hairstyle is reminiscent of Barbarella, while Chima Simone of E! compared her hair to Nancy Sinatra's in her "These Boots Are Made for Walkin'" (1966) video. The video contains intercepted scenes of Grande lying atop a giant spiral on a pink floor wearing a white sweater and high socks. Lia Ben from website Bustle compared the scene to Britney Spears's "Oops!... I Did It Again music video (2000).

Accolades
The video was released on May 30, 2014, and it surpassed 100 million views on July 28, consequently making it Grande's second Vevo-certified music video after "The Way". As of September 2021, the music video has over 1.3 billion views on YouTube. The lyric video was nominated at the 2014 MTV Video Music Awards in the Best Lyric Video category. The official music video was nominated in the Best Collaboration, Best Female Video, and Best Pop Video categories, and it ultimately won the award for Best Pop Video. It was Grande's and Azalea's first time winning a VMA.

Live performances
"Problem" was first performed by Grande at the 2014 Radio Disney Music Awards on April 26, 2014, which were aired a day later on April 27, 2014. It was later performed at Jeffrey Sanker's annual White Party in Palm Springs. Grande has since also performed "Problem" at the 2014 iHeartRadio Music Awards on May 1, 2014, on The Ellen DeGeneres Show on May 6, 2014, and at the Born Free Africa Mother's Day Family Carnival on May 11. Grande has also performed the song at various concerts including the 2014 KIIS-FM's 102.7 Wango Tango annual concert alongside Azalea, for the first time performed with her on May 10, the annual Kiss 108 fm's 2014 Kiss Concert on May 31, 2014, and at the 2014 New York 103.5 KTU concert KTUphoria on June 29, 2014. Grande performed the song at the 2014 Billboard Music Awards alongside Azalea on May 18, 2014. Later, Grande performed on the season 18 finale of Dancing with the Stars on May 20, 2014 and at the 2014 MuchMusic Video Awards on June 15. She performed "Problem" at the 2014 iHeartRadio Ultimate Pool Party, and a piano version on the one-day revival of Total Request Live. On August 28, Grande performed the song at the program Today Show and also during a pocket show held at the Honda Stage at the iHeartRadio Theatre in LA. She also performed "Problem" along with "Bang Bang" and "Break Free" on The X Factor Australia on September 8, 2014. Still on September 8, Ariana performed the song at the Australian TV Show Sunrise along with Break Free. On September 12 she performed a medley version of Problem and Break Free in the Japanese TV Show Music Station. She also performed "Problem" at the iHeartRadio Music Festival on September 19, 2014. Ariana performed the song along with "Break Free" at the 2014 MTV Europe Music Awards on November 9, 2014. Ariana performed the song along with "Break Free" and "Love Me Harder" at the American Music Awards on November 23, 2014.
The song was also performed at the 2014 Victoria's Secret Fashion Show, which was held at Earls Court in London on December 2, 2014. "Problem" was included on the setlist for Grande's 2015 The Honeymoon Tour as a closing song. In 2017, Grande performed a remixed version of the song during the Dangerous Woman Tour.

Cover versions
In July of the same year, English band Rixton released a cover of "Problem". Idolator wrote they "replaced the brass-heavy original with soulful harmonies, snaps and nasty guitar licks. No Iggy section to be found here, but with lead singer Jake's powerful chops at the forefront, the rap is hardly missed." The a cappella group Pentatonix covered the song on their album PTX Vol. 3, released on September 23, 2014. Entertainment Weekly noted the cover was more "low-key" than the original version. Billboard said it was "catchy". On January 9, 2015, "Problem" was covered by Naya Rivera, Heather Morris, Dianna Agron and Kevin McHale in "Homecoming", an episode of Glee. Kidz Bop sung this in E minor on Kidz Bop 27.

Formats and track listings

 CD
 "Problem" – 3:14
 "Problem" (Dawin remix) – 3:25
 "Problem" (Noodles & Devastator remix) – 3:12
 "Problem" (Kassiano remix) – 4:21

 Digital download
 "Problem" – 3:14

 Digital download
 "Problem" (featuring Iggy Azalea and J Balvin) – 3:13

 Digital download (the remixes)
 "Problem" (Dawin remix) – 3:25
 "Problem" (Noodles & Devastator remix) – 3:12
 "Problem" (Kassiano remix) – 4:21

Credits and personnel
Credits adapted from My Everything liner notes.

Recording
 Recorded at Conway Recording Studios (Los Angeles, California) and Wolf Cousins Studio (Stockholm, Sweden)
 Mixed at MixStar Studios (Virginia Beach, Virginia)
 Mastered at Sterling Sound (New York City, New York)

Management
 Wolf Cousins (STIM), Warner Chappell Music Scandinavia, AB (STIM), MXM (administered by Kobalt), Grand Hustle Publishing, Grandarimusic Publishing (ASCAP), MXM (administered by Kobalt) (ASCAP)
 Iggy Azalea appears courtesy of Virgin EMI Records, under exclusive license in the United States to Def Jam Recordings
 Big Sean appears courtesy of Def Jam Recordings

Personnel

 Ariana Grande – lead vocals, songwriting
 Iggy Azalea – featured vocals, songwriting
 Big Sean – backing vocals
 Max Martin – songwriting, production for MXM Productions, vocal production, keys, programming
 Ilya – songwriting, production for Wolf Cousins Productions, guitar, bass, keys, programming, backing vocals
 Savan Kotecha – songwriting, backing vocals
 Shellback – production for Wolf Cousins Productions, keys, programming
 Peter Carlsson – vocal production, engineering
 Sam Holland – engineering
 Serban Ghenea – mixing
 John Hanes – mixing engineering
 Tom Coyne – mastering
 Aya Merrill – mastering
 Leon Silva – saxophone

Charts

Weekly charts

Year-end charts

Certifications and sales

Release history

See also
List of best-selling singles
 List of best-selling singles in Australia
List of best-selling singles in the United States
 List of number-one singles from the 2010s (New Zealand)
 List of top 10 singles in 2014 (France)
 List of UK top 10 singles in 2014
 List of Billboard Hot 100 top 10 singles in 2014
List of Mainstream Top 40 number-one hits of 2014 (U.S.)
List of number-one dance airplay hits of 2014 (U.S.)
List of most-viewed YouTube videos

References

External links
 

Ariana Grande songs
Iggy Azalea songs
2013 songs
2014 singles
Republic Records singles
Song recordings produced by Max Martin
Songs written by Max Martin
Song recordings produced by Ilya Salmanzadeh
Songs written by Ilya Salmanzadeh
Songs written by Ariana Grande
Songs written by Iggy Azalea
Songs written by Savan Kotecha
Irish Singles Chart number-one singles
Number-one singles in Israel
Number-one singles in New Zealand
Number-one singles in Scotland
UK Singles Chart number-one singles
The Collective (band) songs